The 2017–18 season is Académica's third season in the LigaPro. This season they will also take part in the Taça de Portugal and Taça da Liga.

Pre-season and friendlies

Competitions

Overall record

LigaPro

League table

Results by round

Matches

Taça de Portugal

Second round

Taça da Liga

First round

Players

Appearances and goals

{| class="wikitable" style="text-align:center; text-align:center; width:95%"
! rowspan="2" style="vertical-align:center; style=" |
! rowspan="2" style="vertical-align:center; style=" |
! rowspan="2" style="vertical-align:center; style=" |
! rowspan="2" style="vertical-align:center;" |Player
! colspan="3" style="width:85px;" |Primeira Liga
! colspan="3" style="width:85px;" |Taça de Portugal
! colspan="3" style="width:85px;" |Taça da Liga
! colspan="3" style="width:85px;" |Total
|-
!
!
!
!
!
!
!
!
!
!
!
!
|-
| align="right" |1
| align="center" |GK
| align="center" |
| align="left" |Peçanha
|20||0||-17
||1||0||-1
||1||0||0
!22!!0!!-18
|-
| align="right" |3
| align="center" |DF
| align="center" |
| align="left" |William Soares
|3||0||0
||0||0||0
||1||0||0
!4!!0!!0
|-
| align="right" |4
| align="center" |DF
| align="center" |
| align="left" |Hugo Ribeiro
|0||0||0
||0||0||0
||0||0||0
!0!!0!!0
|-
| align="right" |5
| align="center" |DF
| align="center" |
| align="left" |Joel Ferreira
|18||0||0
||1||0||0
||0||0||0
!19!!0!!0
|-
| align="right" |6
| align="center" |MF
| align="center" |
| align="left" |Ricardo Dias
|25||1||0
||0||0||0
||1||0||0
!26!!1!!0
|-
| align="right" |7
| align="center" |FW
| align="center" |
| align="left" |Marinho
|3||19||2
||0||0||0
||1||0||0
!4!!19!!2
|-
| align="right" |8
| align="center" |MF
| align="center" |
| align="left" |Hwang Mun-ki
|6||3||0
||0||0||0
||1||0||0
!7!!3!!0
|-
| align="right" |9
| align="center" |FW
| align="center" |
| align="left" |Hugo Almeida
|14||9||10
||0||0||0
||0||0||0
!14!!9!!10
|-
| align="right" |10
| align="center" |FW
| align="center" |
| align="left" |Jonathan Toro
|11||1||2
||0||0||0
||0||0||0
!11!!1!!2
|-
| align="right" |11
| align="center" |FW
| align="center" |
| align="left" |Júnior Monteiro
|20||4||6
||1||0||0
||0||0||0
!21!!4!!6
|-
| align="right" |12
| align="center" |MF
| align="center" |
| align="left" |Rúben Saldanha
|4||7||0
||0||1||0
||0||0||0
!4!!8!!0
|-
| align="right" |13
| align="center" |DF
| align="center" |
| align="left" |João Real
|12||2||2
||0||0||0
||0||0||0
!12!!2!!2
|-
| align="right" |17
| align="center" |FW
| align="center" |
| align="left" |Romário Baldé
|29||1||2
||1||0||0
||0||0||0
!30!!1!!2
|-
| align="right" |18
| align="center" |DF
| align="center" |
| align="left" |Nuno Esgueirão
|0||0||0
||0||0||0
||0||0||0
!0!!0!!0
|-
| align="right" |19
| align="center" |DF
| align="center" |
| align="left" |Nélson Pedroso
|8||0||0
||0||0||0
||1||0||0
!9!!0!!0
|-
| align="right" |20
| align="center" |FW
| align="center" |
| align="left" |João Traquina
|19||5||0
||1||0||0
||1||0||0
!21!!5!!0
|-
| align="right" |21
| align="center" |MF
| align="center" |
| align="left" |Guima
|16||2||0
||0||0||0
||0||1||0
!16!!3!!0
|-
| align="right" |22
| align="center" |DF
| align="center" |
| align="left" |Jean Felipe
|19||3||0
||1||0||0
||0||0||0
!20!!3!!0
|-
| align="right" |23
| align="center" |DF
| align="center" |
| align="left" |Mike Moura
|17||2||0
||0||0||0
||1||0||0
!18!!2!!0
|-
| align="right" |28
| align="center" |MF
| align="center" |
| align="left" |Reko
|21||6||2
||1||0||0
||1||0||0
!23!!6!!2
|-
| align="right" |30
| align="center" |MF
| align="center" |
| align="left" |David Teles
|1||0||0
||1||0||0
||0||0||0
!1!!1!!0
|-
| align="right" |31
| align="center" |FW
| align="center" |
| align="left" |Femi Balogun
|2||3||0
||0||0||0
||0||0||0
!2!!3!!0
|-
| align="right" |39
| align="center" |FW
| align="center" |
| align="left" |Donald Djoussé
|15||11||5
||1||0||0
||1||0||0
!17!!11!!5
|-
| align="right" |41
| align="center" |GK
| align="center" |
| align="left" |Ricardo Moura
|12||1||-15
||0||0||0
||0||0||0
!12!!1!!-15
|-
| align="right" |43
| align="center" |DF
| align="center" |
| align="left" |Brendon
|18||3||2
||1||0||0
||0||0||0
!19!!3!!2
|-
| align="right" |44
| align="center" |DF
| align="center" |
| align="left" |Yuri Matias
|27||0||2
||1||0||0
||0||0||0
!28!!0!!2
|-
| align="right" |65
| align="center" |MF
| align="center" |
| align="left" |Fernando Alexandre
|9||6||1
||0||0||0
||1||0||0
!10!!6!!1
|-
| align="right" |66
| align="center" |FW
| align="center" |
| align="left" |Diogo Ribeiro
|1||4||0
||0||1||0
||0||1||0
!1!!6!!0
|-
| align="right" |77
| align="center" |FW
| align="center" |
| align="left" |Rodrigo Vilela
|0||1||0
||0||0||0
||0||0||0
!0!!1!!0
|-
| align="right" |83
| align="center" |DF
| align="center" |
| align="left" |Zé Castro
|20||1||0
||0||0||0
||0||0||0
!20!!1!!0
|-
| align="right" |90
| align="center" |GK
| align="center" |
| align="left" |Júlio Neiva
|2||2||-4
||0||0||0
||0||0||0
!2!!2!!-4
|-
! colspan="22" style="background:#eaecf0; text-align:center;"| Players transferred out during the season
|-
| align="right" |10
| align="center" |MF
| align="center" |
| align="left" |Zé Paulo
|2||3||0
||1||0||0
||0||1||0
!3!!4!!0

Transfers

Summer 

In:

Out:

Winter

In:

Out:

Coaching staff

References

2018-19
Portuguese football clubs 2018–19 season